Our Radio Rocks is the sixth single by PJ & Duncan and the last to be taken from their debut album Psyche. As a single, it was released on 13 February 1995. It reached number 15 on the UK Singles Chart.

The music video shows the duo singing the song. Several scenes show dancers and a model of a transmitter atop a planet.

Chart performance

Weekly Charts

References
1. https://www.youtube.com/watch?v=5kK9Bpc7zdQ
2. http://www.discogs.com/PJ-Duncan-AKA-Our-Radio-Rocks/release/1682902

1995 singles
Ant & Dec songs
Pop-rap songs
1995 songs
Telstar Records singles
Songs written by Nicky Graham
Songs written by Deni Lew